is a Japanese racing driver. He is competing in the Japanese Super Formula Championship for Honda and Nakajima Racing

He is not related to two-time Indianapolis 500 winner Takuma Sato.

Career

Formula 4 (2018-2020)
Sato made his single-seater debut with Honda Formula Dream Project in the 2018 FIA F4 Japanese Championship. He finished seventh in the championship with 58 points in his first season. In 2019, Sato dominated the Japanese F4 circuit en route to his first racing championship. He won 11 out of the season's 14 races, including eight wins in a row to end the season, and finished on the podium in all but one race. Sato clinched the 2019 championship in the penultimate race meeting at Sportsland Sugo, and won the championship by 164 points.

He took part in the 2019 French F4 Championship round at Circuit de Nevers Magny-Cours as a guest driver. In 2020, Sato, along with Ayumu Iwasa, raced full-time in the French F4 Championship. Sato finished the season runner-up in the standings behind Iwasa, with four wins and 12 podiums.

Super Formula Lights (2021)
Sato would return to the Japanese circuit after just one season in Europe, competing in the 2021 Super Formula Lights championship with TODA Racing. He won four of the last six races of the season, including a sweep of the August race meeting at Motegi, to finish the year third in the championship behind champion Teppei Natori, and runner-up Giuliano Alesi.

Super GT (2021)
Sato made his Super GT Series debut in 2021, driving the ARTA Honda NSX GT3 in the GT300 class along with two-time series champion Shinichi Takagi. The team finished fourth in the championship, collecting three podium finishes at Fuji Speedway, Sugo, and Motegi, although their results were intermixed with four finishes outside the top nineteen.

In the final race of the season at Fuji, Sato influenced the outcome of the GT500 class championship in controversial manner. While racing the Subaru BRZ of Hideki Yamauchi for position, he went for an overtake into turn one, but braked too late and crashed into the GT500 class Stanley Honda NSX-GT of Naoki Yamamoto, who was in position to win the GT500 championship with 15 laps remaining. The incident took out both Sato and Yamamoto from the race, and it ultimately cost Yamamoto and Team Kunimitsu the GT500 titles, which were won by TOM's and drivers Yuhi Sekiguchi and Sho Tsuboi. After the race, Sato admitted that he was fully responsible for the incident. For 2022, Sato was dropped from Honda's Super GT lineup with his place at the No. 55 ARTA team taken by rookie Iori Kimura. However, Honda affirmed their commitment to Sato by announcing him as a Super Formula driver for 2022.

Super Formula (2022)
Sato took part in the Super Formula manufacturer and rookie test at Suzuka Circuit on 7-9 December, driving the number 15 Red Bull Mugen Team Goh car. Sato finished as the fastest of four rookies on the final day. On 14 January 2022, Sato was announced as a Super Formula driver for Honda. He joined Team Goh, who spun off from Team Mugen and formed a two-car team in 2022. Sato won Rookie of the Year honours ahead of his team mate, Atsushi Miyake, and recorded his first podium in the JAF Grand Prix Suzuka.

Formula One
In February 2022, it was announced that Sato would join the Red Bull Junior Team.However, he was released from Red Bull after just a year.

Racing record

Career summary

† As Sato was a guest driver, he was ineligible to score points.
* Season still in progress.

Complete F4 Japanese Championship results
(key) (Races in bold indicate pole position; races in italics indicate points for the fastest lap of top ten finishers)

Complete French F4 Championship results
(key) (Races in bold indicate pole position) (Races in italics indicate fastest lap)

† As Sato was a guest driver, he was ineligible to score points.

Complete Super Formula Lights results 
(key) (Races in bold indicate pole position) (Races in italics indicate fastest lap)

Complete Super GT results
(key) (Races in bold indicate pole position) (Races in italics indicate fastest lap)

* Season still in progress.

Complete Super Formula results 
(key) (Races in bold indicate pole position) (Races in italics indicate fastest lap)

* Season still in progress.

References

External links
 

2001 births
Living people
Japanese racing drivers
French F4 Championship drivers
Super GT drivers
Super Formula drivers
Karting World Championship drivers
Team Aguri drivers
Japanese F4 Championship drivers